Munirathna Naidu, commonly known as Munirathna, is an Indian film producer-turned-politician from Karnataka who is currently serving as the Minister of Horticulture and Planning, Programme Monitoring & Statistics of Karnataka from 4 August 2021. Member of the BJP, he was elected as a member of the Legislative Assembly of Karnataka from Rajarajeshwari Nagar in the years 2013, 2018 & 2020.  He resigned from the Assembly in July 2019.

Notable films produced by Munirathna include Aunty Preethse, Raktha Kanneeru, Anatharu,  Katari Veera Surasundarangi and Kurukshetra.

Filmography
Aunty Preethse (2001)
Raktha Kanneeru (2003)
Anatharu (2007)
Katari Veera Surasundarangi (2012)
Munirathna Kurukshetra (2019)

Controversies
In December 2014, Lokayukta police recovered 1016 BBMP files related to Rajarajeshwari Nagar constituency from Munirathna's house in Vyalikaval.

In March 2018, Munirathna was named in a 1500 crore BBMP fake bill chargesheet by the Crime Investigation Department. In the chargesheet, Munirathna, who was working as a civil contractor in 2008–09, was found "colluding with BBMP officials and swindling [money] by executing poor quality road work."

Days before the 2018 Karnataka Legislative Assembly election in May 2018, Bangalore Police booked a criminal case against Munirathna after the Election Commission found around 10,000 fake voter ID cards in an apartment in Jalahalli. As a result of this scandal the election in the Rajarajeshwari Nagar constituency was postponed to 28 May, with Munirathna emerging victorious.

References

Indian National Congress politicians from Karnataka
Living people
Kannada film producers
Indian film producers
Bharatiya Janata Party politicians from Karnataka
1964 births